Ecological imperialism is the theory, advanced first by Alfred Crosby, that European settlers were successful in colonization of other regions because of their accidental or deliberate introduction of animals, plants, and disease leading to major shifts in the ecology of the colonized areas and to population collapses in the endemic peoples. The many pathogens they carried with them adversely affected the native populations of North America, Australia, and Africa, and were far more destructive than weaponry: it is estimated that disease wiped out up to 90 percent of indigenous people in some locations.

Cortes and the Aztecs

In the early 16th century, Spanish conquistador Hernán Cortés led an expedition to go to the New World, which lead him to what is now Mexico. The interaction between the Old World Spaniards and New World Aztecs resulted in the total destruction of the Aztec Empire within just two years (February 1519 – August 1521). In spite of the Europeans' more advanced weaponry, technology and Horses, it is believed that the determining factor in the empire's downfall was the arrival of smallpox in the Americas in 1520, which weakened the resistance the Aztec people were able to mount. Even with the horses, bloodhounds, gunpowder, and steel, Cortés had a tough time fighting with the Aztecs; smallpox, on the other hand, was able to spread to those who have not been in contact with it yet, killing off many people, regardless of economic or social status. This was most likely due to Aztec inexperience with the smallpox virus.

"The New World" Settlers and the Native Americans 
In 1607, a group of colonists led by Captain John Smith arrived in North America and established the Jamestown colony in Virginia. Though at first it seemed the colonists would not survive the harsh conditions of the New World, ultimately it was the natives who could not survive the diseases of the Old World. "The colonizers brought along plants and animals new to the Americas, some by design and others by accident. Determined to farm in a European manner, the colonists introduced their domesticated livestock—honeybees, pigs, horses, mules, sheep, and cattle—and their domesticated plants, including wheat, barley, rye, oats, grasses, and grapevines. But the colonists also inadvertently carried pathogens, weeds, and rats." The introduction of these foreign species upset the balance of native species and severely hurt the way of life of the native population. 

The first major smallpox outbreak among natives was between 1616 and 1619 in Massachusetts. Native Americans had never seen a disease like this, and it wiped out entire settlements in nations such as the Abenaki, the Pawtucket, and the Wampanoag. "By wiping out the Indians, smallpox helped the colonists help themselves to land and resources formerly controlled by unfriendly native people. The Europeans could and did colonize virtually unchallenged in some areas." In 1633 there was another devastating epidemic. William Bradford, governor of the Plymouth Colony, observed that: "They lye on their hard matts, ye pox breaking and muttering, and running one into another, their skin cleaving (by reason thereof) to the matts they lye on; when they turn them, a whole side with flea off at once...and they will be all of a gore blood, most fearful to behold. Then being very sore, what with cold and other distempers, they dye like rotten sheep." Syphilis was a New World disease, which was brought back to Europe after settlers came back from the New World; it was extremely devastating, and ran rampant when brought back to the Old World as Syphilis was not as common back in Europe.

Fur trade in North America

During this time of colonialism, Europe had seen a great increase in the demand for luxury fur, mainly by Western Europeans. Serbia at the time was the main source of luxury fur, but was unable to supply enough, thus leading to an increase in the value of fur, which in turn expanded the fur trade in North America. The fur trade was as detrimental to the survival of native people as it was imperative to the success of settlers due to high European demand. Trappers employed natives because of their knowledge of the terrain and wildlife, putting native populations with no immunity to European diseases into close contact with them. Europeans introduced the native population to their worse enemy, diseases that were carried and brought over from their home land. 

The fur trade also upset the ecological balance of North America. "Restraint wasn't a hallmark of the fur trade. In 1822, in the north western regions of the country alone, the Hudson's Bay Company stockpiled 1,500 fox skins, a paltry number compared with the 106,000 beaver skins, but too many none the less. The fur traders had miscalculated. As predators, they had failed to adapt to their prey, and their prey, in turn, retaliated with denial. Of course, the red fox didn't render himself extinct. His numbers merely shrank.". The fur trade not only miscalculated the predator-prey ratio, it allowed for the increase spread of smallpox in the Northern regions of the Americas; Thus creating a geographic commercial route for smallpox to travel from urban populated cities to the rural, open, woodland northern country.

Ecological Imperialism: The Expansion of Europe 900-1900, by Alfred Crosby

Historian and professor Alfred Crosby wrote Ecological Imperialism: The Biological Expansion of Europe, 900-1900 in 1986. He uses the term "Neo-Europes" to describe the places colonized and conquered by Europeans.

See also 

 Colonisation (biology)
 Environmental racism
 Genocide of indigenous peoples
 Locally unwanted land use
 Richard Grove, author of Green Imperialism (1995)

References

Further reading
 Alfred Crosby, Ecological Imperialism: The Biological Expansion of Europe, 900-1900. Cambridge University Press: 1993, 2nd edition 2004. .
 Jared Diamond, Guns, Germs, and Steel. W.W. Norton & Company: 2005. .
 Sharon Kirsch, What Species of Creatures: Animal Relations From the New World. New Star Books: 2008. .
 Mark Elvin, The Retreat of the Elephants: An Environmental History of China. Yale University Press, 2006. .
 Alan Taylor, American Colonies (Penguin Books: 2002), 280-300
 Stephanie True Peters, Epidemic! Smallpox in the New World. Benchmark Books, 2005. .

European colonization of the Americas
Environmental social science concepts
History of globalization
Imperialism